Shahe Subdistrict (沙河街道) could refer to the following subdistricts in China:

Shahe Subdistrict, Chongqing, in Wanzhou District, Chongqing
Shahe Subdistrict, Guangzhou, in Tianhe District, Guangzhou, Guangdong
Shahe Subdistrict, Shenzhen, in Nanshan District, Shenzhen, Guangdong
Shahe Subdistrict, Baotou, in Jiuyuan District, Baotou, Inner Mongolia
Shahe Subdistrict, Anshan, Liaoning, in Lishan District, Anshan, Liaoning
Shahe Subdistrict, Binzhou, in Bincheng District, Binzhou, Shandong
Shahe Subdistrict, Chengdu, in Jinjiang District, Chengdu, Sichuan